Dhamani is a village in Ambegaon taluka of Pune District in the state of Maharashtra, India. The village is administrated by a Sarpanch who is an elected representative of village as per constitution of India and Panchayati raj (India).

Geographical location and population

Dhamani is a village in Ambegaon taluka of Pune district covering an area of 1393.71 hectares. As per 2011 census, the village has 673 families and a total population of 3814. The nearest town [Manchar] is at a distance of 32 km. There are 1384 males and 1430 females.

Literacy

    Total literate population: 2075 (73.74%)
    Literate male population: 1139 (82.3%)
    Literate female population: 936 (65.45%)

Educational facility
There is 1 government pre-primary school in the village. There is 1 government district primary school in the village. There is 1 Government Higher Secondary and Secondary School in the village. The nearest degree college (Pabal) is at a distance of more than 10 km. The nearest engineering college (Avsari) is more than 10 km away.

Medical Facility (Government)

There is 1 government hospital center in the village.

The nearest community health center is more than 15 km away. There is 1 primary health center in the village. The nearest primary health sub-center is more than 15 km away. There is 1 maternity and child welfare center at Manchar in the village. The nearest Alternative Medicine Hospital is more than 10 km away. There is 1 hospital in the village. The nearest veterinary hospital is more than 10 km away. There is 1 family welfare center in the village.

References

External links
  Villages in pune maharashtra

Villages in Pune district